Mexico City International Contemporary Film Festival, or FICCO (Festival Internacional de Cine Contemporáneo) for its initials in Spanish was an annual film festival founded by film producers Michel Lipkes and Paula Astorga in February 2004.  The festival ran for seven years, ending in 2010 and reopened in 2014 for Narrative only Film.

It quickly become one of the most important film festivals in Latin America. It was hosted by Cinemex, one of the two dominant movie theater chains in Mexico. It lasted two weeks and programmed sections on documentary features, fiction, worldwide premieres, retrospectives, and global tendencies in cinema. The jury was composed of important figures of the film industry worldwide.

In 2007 it programmed documentary retrospectives on Peter Watkins and Peter Whitehead, and a retrospective on Robert Bresson and Pedro Costa.

Awards

FICCO-Cinemex Award for Best Narrative Film
2004 - The Return - Andrey Zvyagintsev
2005 - Turtles Can Fly - Bahman Ghobadi
2006 - The Death of Mr. Lazarescu - Cristi Puiu
2007 - 12:08 East of Bucharest - Corneliu Porumboiu
2008 - El cielo, la tierra y la lluvia - José Luis Torres Leiva
2009 - Ballast - Lance Hammer and Los paranoicos - Gabriel Medina
2014 - Kung Fury - David Sandberg
2015 - Me and My Moulton - Torill Kove
2016 - Seline - Luciano Francesco Silighini Garagnani Lambertini

FICCO-Cinemex Award for Best Documentary Film
2005 - Tie Xi Qu: West of the Tracks - Wang Bing
2006 - Workingman's Death - Michael Glawogger
2007 - Nacido sin / Born Without - Eva Norvind
2008 - Hunters Since the Beginning of Time - Carlos Casas
2009 - Tie: Waltz with Bashir - Ari Folman and Puisque nous sommes nés - Jean-Pierre Duret and Andrea Santana

Best Latin American Film
2006 - Paraguayan Hammock - Paz Encina

FICCO-Movie City Award for Best Debut Film
2009 - Cómo estar muerto/Como estar muerto - Manuel Ferrari and The Pleasure of Being Robbed - Joshua Safdie

Pfizer Human Rights Award
2009 -Access Road - Nathalie Mansoux

Exxonmobil Award for Best Female Director
2009 - $9.99 - Tatia Rosenthal

Best Mexican Digital Film
2009 - Calentamiento local - Fernando Frías

Fipresci Award for Best Mexican Documentary Film
2006 - Copacabana - Martín Rejtman
2009 - Nuestra lucha - Jaime Rogel

See also
 Film festivals in North and Central America

References

Film festivals in Mexico
Defunct film festivals